Mitsinjo is a town and commune in western Madagascar.

Mitsinjo may also refer to different places in Madagascar:

 Mitsinjo, Sakaraha, a municipality in  Sakaraha, Atsimo Andrefana
 Mitsinjo Betanimena, a municipality in Toliara II District,  Atsimo Andrefana
 Ambatry Mitsinjo, a municipality in Betioky-Atsimo, Atsimo-Andrefana
 Anivorano Mitsinjo, a municipality in Bekily District in Androy
 Ambohimitsinjo, a municipality in Sambava District, Sava Region

Non governmental agencies
 Association Mitsinjo, an NGO in Andasibe, Moramanga that com-manages the Analamazaotra Forest Station

See also
 Mitsino, a municipality in Russia